Hvoslef is a surname. Notable people with the surname include:

Anna Hvoslef (1866–1954), Norwegian journalist, conservative politician and feminist
Einar Hvoslef (1876–1931), Norwegian sailor
Ketil Hvoslef (born 1939), Norwegian composer
Waldemar Hvoslef (1825–1906), Norwegian Lutheran bishop